Charles Janet (15 June 1849 – 7 February 1932) was a French engineer, company director, inventor and biologist. He is also known for his innovative left-step  presentation of the periodic table of chemical elements.

Life and work
Janet graduated from the École Centrale Paris in 1872, and worked for some years as a chemist and engineer in a few factories in Puteaux (1872), Rouen (1873–4), and Saint-Ouen (1875–6). He then got employed by Philippe Alphonse Dupont, at Société A. Dupont & Cie, a factory that produced bone buttons and fine brushes, and got married Berthe Marie Antonia Dupont in November 1877, the daughter of the owner, and worked there for the rest of his life, finding time for research in various branches of science. His collection of 40,000 fossils and other specimens was unfortunately dispersed after his death.
His studies of the morphology of the head of ants, wasps and bees, and his micrographs were of remarkable quality. He also worked on plant biology and finally wrote a series of papers on evolution. He was a prolific inventor and designed much of his own equipment, including the formicarium, in which an ant colony is made visible by being formed between two panes of glass. In 1927 he turned his attention to the periodic table and wrote a series of six articles in French, which were privately printed and never widely circulated. His only article in English was poorly edited and gave a confused idea of his thinking.

Scientific Work
In parallel with his professional activities, Charles Janet began a university course at the Sorbonne in 1886. He was also co-opted to become a member of the Société entomologique de France (French Entomological Society) and the French Zoological Society. First in his class, he then began a thesis on ants and obtained his doctorate in natural sciences in 1900. Even before the end of his studies, the Academy of Sciences regularly published his research in its reports and awarded him the Thore Prize in 1896. In 1899, he was elected president of the Société zoologique de France (French Zoological Society). In 1900, he improved his artificial nests and won great success with them at the Universal Exhibition in Paris. His popularity was then large enough to attract the interest of journalists who described in detailed articles the new public's myrmecophile passion. In 1909, the Academy of Sciences awarded him a new accessit: the Cuvier Prize for the most remarkable work in zoology. Around 1900, Charles Janet was a recognized entomologist among zoologists and known to the general public. However, he conducted several research in many areas in parallel. His work consisted of over 4,000 pages of scientific articles. Today, Charles Janet is perceived either as a myrmecologist from the past or as an emerging chemist.

Geology and paleontology
Charles Janet explored the Paris Basin and especially its chalk. At the request of Edmond Hébert and his geology laboratory at the École Pratique des Hautes Études, he organized a geological excursion around Beauvais for the students of the Sorbonne and the Museum. He quickly assembled a remarkable collection of fossil and prehistoric pieces. He estimated it contained around 50,000 items. A large part of the collection includes fossils from regional deposits that have now disappeared or are almost inaccessible, such as the Bracheux Sands (partially covered by the expansion of the city of Beauvais). Charles Janet also developed a method for preserving the very fragile shells of these geological layers. Other local Tertiary deposits are well represented, such as the Cuisian, Ypresian, and Lutetian from the regions of Chaumont-en-Vexin, Parnes, Grignon, Chambors, and Mouy. The collection also includes numerous echinoderms, for which he co-wrote an article with Lucien Cuénot. In the chalk of the Beauvais area, he discovered three new species of belemnites. These are Actinocamax grossouvrei, Actinocamax toucasi, and Actinocamax alfridi.

Entomology

Janet was particularly interested in social hymenoptera.

In 1894, he observed a hornet's nest from its origin until the death of the last worker. During these 5 months of uninterrupted observations, he discovered the trophallaxis of hornet larvae. Continuing with insect ethology, he invented a vertical artificial nest that remained a classic tool for entomologists for a long time. This type of nest allowed him to understand how some insects live at the expense of ants. He surprised, for example, the silverfish stealing the droplet of sugary liquid exchanged between two ants. He then provided us with in-depth studies on the internal anatomy of ants, where he endeavored to show their organization in metameres. In the young ant queen, he discovered the transformation of flight muscles after she tore off her wings. He demonstrated that these muscles evolve into lipid cells, providing the necessary energy for this queen who does not feed during the long months it takes to establish her colony.

In the end, 22 of the 24 notes he proposed to the Academy of Sciences were related to social insects. He gradually sought to closely link ethology with insect physiology through histological sections, where some believe he did wonders. Although he is still often cited as a classic author among entomologists, Charles Janet has been completely forgotten in his other research fields. About him, Maurice Maeterlinck wrote:

"It is necessary to mention the engineer Charles Janet, whose countless studies, research, communications, monographs, precise, clear, impeccable, and adorned with anatomical plates that have become classics, have continued, for nearly fifty years, to enrich myrmecology as well as many other sciences. He is one of those great workers to whom justice is done only after their death".

Botany 
The shift towards botany is not an abandonment of zoology, but a broader reflection in which insects will be included. Building on his studies of insect metamerism, he then seeks to conceive a common ancestor for animals and plants. According to Janet, current metazoans would come from colonies of flagellated protozoa. This is why he believes that the only remaining links between the two kingdoms are those where animals and plants are still in a unicellular state. Charles Janet decides to study Volvox, as it has often been considered an intermediate between animals and plants, as well as between unicellular and multicellular organisms. For Janet, the Volvox, which has not evolved since its divergence from phyto-flagellates, is therefore a living fossil that strongly recalls the beginnings of metazoans.

He is particularly interested in the successions of cellular development between two generations. A few years later, a theory called orthobiontics will emerge, in which Janet outlines an organization plan for living beings. According to him, all extinct and current beings can be described by only 7 orthobiontic plans. In this synthesis where he bridges the gap between the animal and plant kingdoms, he will go as far as to completely mathematize his observations by formulating the observed cellular generations.

Ultimately based on excessive theorization that takes precedence over his observations, undermined by a text filled with complex neologisms, all translated into mathematical language, this theory remained inaccessible. It was also extremely poorly received in the Revue générale des Sciences pures et appliquées.

Chemistry

At the age of 78, he undertakes research on atoms. He was interested in the properties of atoms and the organization of their nuclei. To synthesize his ideas, he reflects on a periodic classification of atomic elements. For him, their physico-chemical properties are intimately linked to their arithmetic and graphical arrangement.

Moreover, the perfect regularity he observes at all levels of his table is, for Janet, proof that he has discovered the correct distribution law. In 1930, he even proposes to verify it by aligning his classification with the very recent quantum theory. In doing so, he is the first to state the rule that describes the order in which electrons fill the subshells of an atom. This rule, later rediscovered, is commonly called the Madelung rule since 1936 among English speakers or the Klechkowski rule (of Soviet origin in 1962 and in use in France). Confidentially, Janet's classification will remain completely ignored in France. Thanks to these astonishing spiral figures, it will reappear 40 years later among American chemists before a new eclipse. It has only been considered a valid alternative to the famous Mendeleev's classification under the name of Left Step Table for about a decade. Eric Scerri, an American historian (UCLA), has popularized Janet's form in magazines such as Scientific American or Pour la Science. He also devotes an entire chapter of his latest work to Charles Janet, whom he sees as a minor contributor in terms of fame, but major in terms of ideas.

Periodic table
Janet started from the fact that the series of chemical elements is a continuous sequence, which he represented as a helix traced on the surfaces of four nested cylinders. By various geometrical transformations he derived several striking designs, one of which is his "left-step periodic table", in which hydrogen and helium are placed above lithium and beryllium. It was only later that he realized that his arrangement agreed perfectly with quantum theory and the electronic structure of the atom. He placed the actinides under the lanthanides twenty years before Glenn Seaborg, and he continued the series to element 120.

There is then no need to interrupt the sequence or move the f block into a 'footnote'. He believed that no elements heavier than number 120 would be found, so he did not envisage a g block. In terms of atomic quantum numbers, each row corresponds to one value of the sum  where n is the principal quantum number and ℓ the azimuthal quantum number. The philosopher of chemistry Eric Scerri has written extensively in favor of Janet's left-step periodic table, and it is being increasingly discussed as a candidate for the optimal or most fundamental form of the periodic table.

Janet also envisaged an element zero whose 'atom' would consist of two neutrons, and he speculated that this would be the link to a mirror-image table of elements with negative atomic numbers – in effect anti-matter. He also conceived of heavy hydrogen (deuterium). He died just before the discovery of the neutron, the positron and heavy hydrogen. 
His work was championed most notably by Edward G. Mazurs.

Family
Charles Janet is better known than his brother, Armand Janet, also an engineer and entomologist. Armand Janet became renowned as a lepidopterist and served as president of the Société entomologique de France in 1911. Armand Janet is also known as a caver and explorer and was one of the first to explore the Verdon Gorge.

References and notes

External links 
 Biographie synthétique de Charles Janet
Eric Scerri, 2020, The Periodic Table: Its Story and Its Significance, 2nd edition, Oxford University Press, New York, 

1932 deaths
1849 births
19th-century French chemists
French lepidopterists
People involved with the periodic table
19th-century French engineers
20th-century French engineers
20th-century chemists
19th-century French zoologists
20th-century French zoologists
19th-century biologists
20th-century biologists
French biologists
19th-century French inventors
20th-century French inventors